Elena Avram (born 17 December 1954) is a Romanian rower. She competed in the women's eight event at the 1976 Summer Olympics.

References

External links
 

1954 births
Living people
Romanian female rowers
Olympic rowers of Romania
Rowers at the 1976 Summer Olympics
People from Neamț County